XHEMA-FM/XEMA-AM is a radio station in Fresnillo, Zacatecas. Broadcasting on 107.9 FM, XHEMA/XEMA is owned by Grupo Radiofónico B-15 and carries the national La Mejor format from MVS Radio.

History
XEMA-AM received its concession on July 26, 1940. It was owned by José Miguel Acevedo Mora and broadcast on 1340 kHz.

On January 13, 1972, it was sold to Hilda Gómez de Bonilla, who moved the station to 690 kHz. The move also allowed the station to increase its daytime power from 1 kW to 10.

In 2011, XEMA received authorization to move to FM on 107.1 MHz, with the callsign XHEMA-FM. However, it did not remain on its new frequency long, as in September 2013, XHEMA moved to 107.9 MHz and increased power to 100,000 watts.

References

Regional Mexican radio stations
Radio stations in Zacatecas
Radio stations in Mexico with continuity obligations